A Guide to Recognizing Your Saints is a 2006 American drama film based on a 2001 memoir of the same name by author, director, and musician Dito Montiel, which describes his youth in Astoria, New York during the 1980s.
Montiel wrote and directed the film adaptation, which was released in the United States in September and October 2006 and in Europe in March 2007. The film stars Robert Downey Jr. as Montiel with Shia LaBeouf as a younger Montiel.

The film's narrative jumps frequently between 2005 and flashbacks from 1986 (filmed largely with shaky camera with short shots) with characters occasionally addressing the viewer.

Plot
Present Day (2001): 
Dito is a successful writer in Los Angeles. One day, after being urged by his mother, Flori, and his friend, Nerf, Dito visits his childhood home, Astoria, New York, because his father has suddenly become very ill. The film switches back and forth between the present and flashbacks with Dito's memories in the summer of 1986.

Dito meets Nerf, and talks with him in a parked car, where they can talk undisturbed, which would not have been possible at Nerf's house. Dito then visits Laurie, his childhood sweetheart, who is now a mother. They only talk through the open window; she does not let him in. Dito finally visits his overprotective father, Monty. Monty used to ignore Dito's feelings, and he didn't want Dito to travel. He is angry at Dito for leaving, and for not returning sooner to visit; he then sends Dito away. Laurie urges him to be a man and come to terms with his father, who was heartbroken when he left. Dito does leave, but returns later, to insist that he take his father to the hospital.

1986: 
Antonio, an overconfident, volatile boy with an abusive father, eventually kills someone: the Puerto Rican gang member Reaper, as payback for an attack on young Dito.

Viewers are then introduced to Antonio's younger brother, Giuseppe - reckless, destructive, and possibly insane.  Giuseppe lies on a subway track; in spite of urgent warnings from his brother Antonio and Nerf, that a train was coming, he failed to get back on the platform and was killed.

Mike O'Shea, another friend of Dito's, was a Scottish boy who dreamt of becoming a musician. Mike and Dito had planned to go to California on a bus. They worked for a gay  drug addict, Frank, with a dog-walking business. They went to his house to collect the wages he was slow in paying. At first he did not listen to them, but then he gave them all the money he kept in the refrigerator, more than he owed them and told them to leave town. Shortly thereafter, Mike was murdered by a member of a Puerto Rican gang in retaliation for the murder of Reaper, after which Dito travelled alone to California.

Present Day: 
Dito visits the adult Antonio in prison and sees him as a changed man of wisdom. The film concludes with the two of them sitting down in conversation.

Cast

 Robert Downey Jr. as Dito Montiel
 Shia LaBeouf as young Dito
 Rosario Dawson as Laurie
 Melonie Diaz as young Laurie
 Eric Roberts as Antonio
 Channing Tatum as young Antonio
 Chazz Palminteri as Monty Montiel
 Dianne Wiest as Flori Montiel
 Scott Campbell as Nerf
 Peter Tambakis as young Nerf
 Federico Castelluccio as Antonio & Giuseppe's father
 Adam Scarimbolo as Giuseppe
 Martin Compston as Mike O'Shea
 Anthony DeSando as Frank the dog walker
 Eleonore Hendricks as Jenny
 Michael Rivera as Reaper

Production
This film was Montiel's directorial debut.

Initially, Montiel refused to see LaBeouf for the part, having only seen him as the "Disney guy." Once he got to audition for the role, he "fucked his office up," putting a "hole through the wall" and went as "crazy" as he could in order to change the image Montiel had of him to land the part.

Characters
Montiel states that all the characters in the film are a combination of at least three people and sometimes six or seven, although some characters are given the names of people from real life. Listed below are some of the main differences between four characters and their real-life counterparts.

Laurie
Montiel said that he made the film because “I wanted to walk down those streets again and fall in love with Laurie again, it would have been nice to have had that moment at the end of the film where Dito met Laurie, reconnecting as adults." The real-life Laurie was white instead of Hispanic and died two years earlier from AIDS.

Antonio
Montiel states that Antonio is a composite of three people. The book mentions a kid named Antonio Ruggeria who was sent to prison for manslaughter, escaped, and was later sent to prison again for things "that are even beyond putting in a movie that people might find redeemable." In the book, a copy of a newspaper article describing Antonio's escape from Rikers Island has the crime he committed blanked out.

Giuseppe
The film shows Giuseppe getting killed on a subway track. The inspiration for the scene was a kid named Billy who was "riding" trains when he was killed. The real Giuseppe Ruggeria is a career criminal who was deported to Milan. Montiel describes the real Giuseppe as being like a cat. "The train would come and two seconds later he would pop up."

Mike
The Scottish character Mike is a composite of a man named Mike O'Shea; a kid named Ray, who used to go to the city with Dito, sniff amyl nitrite and smoke hashish; and Angelo Ruggeria (a younger brother of Antonio) who was later murdered. The real Mike O'Shea is Irish, alive, married, and living in Essex, England.

Reception
The film made $2,035,468 worldwide. It currently holds a 75% "Certified Fresh" rating on Rotten Tomatoes.

Awards and nominations
Sundance Film Festival

Gijón International Film Festival

Independent Spirit Awards

Home video release
The DVD of the film was released on February 20, 2007 in the United States.

References

External links
 
 
 
 
 

2006 films
American crime drama films
2000s Spanish-language films
2006 crime drama films
Hood films
American independent films
American coming-of-age drama films
Films set in New York City
Films set in 1986
Films set in 2001
Films based on memoirs
Films directed by Dito Montiel
Films produced by Trudie Styler
Films scored by Jonathan Elias
2006 directorial debut films
2006 independent films
2000s English-language films
2000s American films